The 48 Laws of Power (1998) is a non-fiction book by American author Robert Greene. The book is a New York Times bestseller, selling over 1.2 million copies in the United States; it is popular with prison inmates and celebrities.

Background
Greene initially formulated some of the ideas in The 48 Laws of Power while working as a writer in Hollywood and concluding that today's power elite shared similar traits with powerful figures throughout history. In 1995, Greene worked as a writer at Fabrica, an art and media school, and met a book packager named Joost Elffers. Greene pitched a book about power to Elffers and six months later, Elffers requested that Greene write a treatment.

Although Greene was quite unhappy in his job, he was comfortable and saw the time needed to write a proper book proposal as too risky. However, at the time Greene was rereading his favorite biography about Julius Caesar and took inspiration from Caesar's decision to cross the Rubicon River and fight Pompey, thus inciting the Great Roman Civil War. Greene wrote the treatment, which would later become The 48 Laws of Power. He would note this as the turning point of his life.

Reception
The 48 Laws of Power has sold over 1.2 million copies in the United States and has been translated into 24 languages. Fast Company called the book a "mega cult classic", and The Los Angeles Times noted that The 48 Laws of Power turned Greene into a "cult hero with the hip-hop set, Hollywood elite and prison inmates alike".

[]The 48 Laws of Power']]' has been reported to be much requested in American prison libraries,Garner, Dwight. The Readers Behind Bars Put Books to Many Uses. The New York Times. October 19, 2010. and has been studied as a first-year text in some US colleges. Rapper 50 Cent stated that he related to the book "immediately", and approached Greene with the prospect of a potential collaboration, which would later become The 50th Law, another New York Times bestseller. Busta Rhymes and Derrius Jackson used The 48 Laws of Power to deal with problematic movie producers. DJ Premier has a tattoo inspired from Law #5, "Reputation is the cornerstone of power", on his arm and DJ Calvin Harris has an "Enter with boldness" arm tattoo based on Law #28. The 48 Laws of Power has also been mentioned in songs by UGK, Jay Z, Kanye West, Central Cee, MF DOOM, and Drake.
 Dov Charney, founder and former CEO of American Apparel, frequently quoted the laws during board meetings, has given friends and employees copies of the book, and appointed Greene to the board of American Apparel. Former Cuban President Fidel Castro is also claimed by the book's author to have read the book.  The book has been banned by several US prisons.The 48 Laws of Power has been referenced, or bought by 50 Cent, Jay-Z, Busta Rhymes, Michael Jackson (who wrote in the margins), Courtney Love (who was photographed carrying it on the way to court when facing a drugs charge), and Will Smith.

Professor Jeffrey Pfeffer said that Greene's so-called laws are based on isolated examples, and not on solid research. Kirkus Reviews said Greene offers no evidence to support his world view, Greene's laws contradict each other, and the book is "simply nonsense". Newsweek also points out ways it says the laws contradict each other and says, "Intending the opposite, Greene has actually produced one of the best arguments since the New Testament for humility and obscurity." Director'' magazine states "some of Greene's 'laws' seem contradictory" and the work is "plodding and didactic".

References

External links
 Power, Seduction and War: The Robert Greene Blog

1998 non-fiction books
Books by Robert Greene (American author)
Self-help books
Business books
Viking Press books